Hovnan Derderian (born 1 December 1957) is the youngest Armenian cleric to have been elevated to the rank of archbishop.

Life

Born Vahram Derderian in Beirut, he studied at the Antelias Seminary and the Seminary of the Holy See in Etchmiadzin, Armenia. Upon his graduation in 1980 he was ordained a celibate priest by Vazken I, Catholicos of All Armenians, taking the name Hovnan.

See also
 Armenian Apostolic Church

References

External links
Biography from the Western Diocese of the Armenian Church of North America website

1957 births
Living people
Religious leaders from Beirut
Lebanese people of Armenian descent
Alumni of St Stephen's House, Oxford
Bishops of the Armenian Apostolic Church
Lebanese Oriental Orthodox Christians